Michal Kokavec (born 1 March 1983) is a Slovak professional ice hockey player who currently plays for HK Dubnica in the Slovak 1. Liga.

He previously played in the Slovak Extraliga for Slovan Bratislava, HK 36 Skalica, MsHK Žilina, HC '05 Banská Bystrica and MHC Martin.

References

External links

1983 births
Living people
HC Almaty players
Arystan Temirtau players
HC '05 Banská Bystrica players
HC Slovan Bratislava players
MKS Cracovia (ice hockey) players
Erie Otters players
Hannover Indians players
MHC Martin players
HC Prešov players
HK 36 Skalica players
Slovak ice hockey left wingers
MsHK Žilina players
HK Dubnica players
Slovak expatriate ice hockey players in the United States
Slovak expatriate ice hockey players in Germany
Expatriate ice hockey players in Kazakhstan
Expatriate ice hockey players in Poland
Slovak expatriate sportspeople in Poland
Slovak expatriate sportspeople in Kazakhstan